The Lure of the Gown is a 1909 American silent short drama film directed by D. W. Griffith.

Plot
The story as told by Moving Picture World reads:

Cast
 Marion Leonard as Isabelle
 Harry Solter as Enrico
 Florence Lawrence as Veronica

References

External links
 

1909 films
1909 drama films
1909 short films
Silent American drama films
American silent short films
American black-and-white films
Films directed by D. W. Griffith
1900s American films